Cyrene Antiquity Museum is an archaeological museum located in Shahhat, Libya. It contains several statues and mosaics from the ancient Greek and later Roman city Cyrene.

According to a multi level research, four out of 200 statues at Cyrene Antiquity museum have previously been identified as dolomitic marble from the northern Aegean island of Thasos.

List of statues 

 Head of Atheana 
 Kore of the Torolina 
 Statues of Thaila

See also

 List of museums in Libya

References 

Museums with year of establishment missing
Tripolitania
Archaeological museums in Libya